Hugh Aglionby (by 1521 – between 1552 and 1554), of London, was an English politician.

Career
Aglionby was a Member of Parliament for Carlisle in 1545. He held the office of a Comptroller of the mint from 8 March 1542 to 25 March 1544. He was a clerk of the council to Queen Catherine Parr twice, the first one by September 1544, and the second time by 8 August 1548. "He later succeeded Walter Butler as the Queen’s secretary and after her death Edward VI granted him and his wife in survivorship an annuity of £30".

Personal life
Aglionby was possibly the son of Edward Aglionby, MP for Carlisle. Hugh was married, by May 1550, to a woman named Anne. They had one daughter and at least one son, the MP, Thomas Aglionby.

He was dead by 15 June 1554 when Queen Mary renewed his £20 annuity in his widow's name.

References

Year of birth missing
1550s deaths
Politicians from London
16th-century births
English MPs 1545–1547
Politicians from Carlisle, Cumbria